The 1926 San Sebastián Grand Prix was a Grand Prix motor race held at Circuito Lasarte on 18 July 1926. It was also designated as the European Grand Prix.

It was the third race of the 1926 AIACR World Manufacturers' Championship season. The Delage 15 S 8 made its racing debut here but proved to be quite challenging to drive. The exhaust pipes of the Delage's passed beneath the floor where the drivers' feet were, causing them to gradually burn. The drivers had to take turns in the cars, in order to avoid serious injury.

As Robert Sénéchal was not listed as an official Delage reserve driver, after the race both cars he drove were disqualified, as well as the Bugatti driven by unofficial reserve driver Louis Dutilleux. However after an appeal to the AIACR Court of Appeals, these results were all reinstated as the officials had approved the driver changes during the race.

Classification

References 

San Sebastian Grand Prix
European Grand Prix